Super Noodles  is the brand name of a dehydrated instant noodle snack, made by Batchelors in the United Kingdom (previously made by Kellogg's) and sold under the McDonnells brand in Ireland. They are prepared by being placed in a pot  of boiling water, adding the sachet of flavouring, and stirring. Super Noodles can also be cooked and prepared using a microwave oven.

The brand is currently owned by Premier Foods in the United Kingdom, and Boyne Valley Group in Ireland. In February 2017, Premier released Super Noodles pots. The line up has "exceeded expectation", selling over 13 million units giving Premier its "strongest growth in five year".

Flavours

 Chicken
 Curry
 Bacon
 Chow Mein
 Chilli Chicken
 Thai Sweet Chilli
 Peri Peri Chicken
 Thai Green Curry
 BBQ Beef
 BBQ Sweet Chicken
 Pulled Pork
 Chicken & Mushroom
 Steak Fajita
 Southern Fried Chicken
 Mild Mexican Chilli
 Sizzling King Prawn
 Vindaloo
 Steak & Ale Pie
 Ginger
 Cheeseburger
 Chipotle Chicken
 Peking Duck

Super Noodles To Go
Super Noodles To Go is a cup noodle sister product, competing with Pot Noodle.  Rather than preparing the noodles in a saucepan of boiling water, the consumer pours boiling water into the cup of noodles and stirs. Flavours include Roast Chicken, however, the flavour differs from the standard Super Noodle range.

Commercials
The convenience of the product targeted a male demographic in UK television commercials during the late 1990s. It featured the early performances of Martin Freeman, Peter Serafinowicz and Jake Wood in humorous situations reflecting British “Lad culture” of the era.

Restaurant
In October 2018, new restaurant Frankie's Toasties, opened on Portland Street in Manchester and began serving "32 fillings including Mars Bars and Super Noodles". The "Salford Super Noodle Butty" includes Super Noodles with instant chicken flavour noodles.

See also

 Cup Noodles
 Indomie
 Koka noodles
 List of instant noodle brands
 Maggi noodles

References

External links
Official website

Instant noodle brands
British snack foods
Premier Foods brands
Campbell Soup Company brands